Diagram of Suburban Chaos is the pseudonym of William Collin Snavely, a composer of electronic music.

Biography
Snavely has been creating electronic music in various forms since 1994, exploring editing waveforms on Amiga computers. Acquiring various pieces of gear as a teenager, the Ohio rave scene played a major part in his musical development. He and his older brother formed a musical partnership recording homebrewed techno to cassette with a mixer, old tape deck, samples, Roland Tr-606 and anything else he could find.

Snavely moved to Seattle in 1997, where he met Darrin Wiener, the cofounder of Imputor? Records. They worked together on several projects, and the first Diagram of Suburban Chaos album, Status Negatives, was released by Imputor? in 2002.

Snavely has released a number of tracks since then on labels including Tiger Style Records and Audiobulb. While his professional focus has moved more towards soundtrack composition and sound design , Snavely continues to write under the D.O.S.C. name and hopes to release a second album in the near future.

Discography
 Status Negatives Imputor?
 Status Negatives (European Release CD) Zealectronic
 Mixed Signals: Cheetah (CD) Tiger Style
 Mixed Signals: Cheetah (2x12") Rocket Racer
 Extreme Electronics And Splintered Beats: Shielded By The Sun (UndaCova Remix) (2xCD) Darkmatter Soundsystem
 Intricate Maximals: So Gone (Ventrimix) (CD) Audiobulb
 Exhibition #3: Nerve Cycle (CD) Audiobulb
 Edge of the Pool (EP) Imputor?
 Ambit the Album (aka Taco 2) (EP) Imputor?

External links

Reviews and articles
 Digital Nimbus: Status Negatives Review
 Grooves Magazine: Status Negatives Review
 Transworld Stance: Status Negatives Review
 BPM Magazine / DJMixed.com:Status Negatives Review
 Spin: The Hit List - More Artists You Need To Know About
 Digital Artifact: Status Negatives Review
 Pulse! Magazine (Tower): Status Negatives Review
 Allmusic: Status Negatives Review
 Creative Loafing Atlanta: Tristeza - Mixed Signals Review
 Philadelphia City Paper: Status Negatives Review
 The Portland Mercury: Suddenly, Electricity! - An Imperative iDM Show/Dance Move Guide
 The Portland Mercury: Show Preview
 Willamette Week (Portland): Status Negatives Review
 Allmusic: Tristeza - Mixed Signals Review
 Mixer: Status Negatives Review
 Feature Magazine (SD): Status Negatives Review
 SLAMM Magazine #176: Status Negatives Review
 SLAMM Magazine #176: Tristeza - Mixed Signals Review
 em411.com: Status Negatives Review
 Rock Bites Daily: Diagram Of Suburban Chaos announce debut LP
 anti-statik: Status Negatives Review

Related links
 Discography on Discogs.com
 Artist website
 Status Negatives at Amazon.com
 Diagram of Suburban Chaos @ Imputor? Records
 Diagram of Suburban Chaos @ Last.fm

American electronic musicians
Living people
Year of birth missing (living people)
Intelligent dance musicians